Hypotacha isthmigera is a species of moth in the family Erebidae. It is found in Angola, Ethiopia, Kenya, Mali, Namibia, Nigeria, Oman, Senegal, South Africa, Sudan, Tanzania and Yemen.

The larvae have been recorded feeding on Acacia tortilis and Acacia senegal.

References

Moths described in 1968
Hypotacha
Moths of Africa
Moths of Asia